Eastern Hancock High School is a public high school located just north of Charlottesville, Indiana. It is managed by the Community School Corporation of Eastern Hancock County. Schools in neighboring Wilkinson, Shirley, and Charlottesville consolidated in 1970 forming the Eastern Hancock district that includes all the eastern third of Hancock County.

History
Although Eastern Hancock's school district covers more area than any other school district in the county, it has the smallest number of enrolled students due to eastern Hancock County being mainly rural. The Community School Corporation of Eastern Hancock County represents the consolidation of the school's three townships: Brown, Blue River and Jackson. The towns of Wilkinson, Shirley, Charlottesville, Warrington, Willow Branch and parts of Greenfield are all in the Eastern Hancock School District.

The school began in 1964-65, but the new Eastern Hancock Junior-Senior High School facilities were completed in 1971. The Elementary building was completed in 1979 and the Middle School was completed in 1996.

Consolidation History to become the Community School Corporation of  Eastern Hancock County:  
 Eastern Hancock - Royals
 Charlottesville - Eagles
 Westland -  Bears
 Blue River Township Schools 
 Jackson Township Schools
Stinger School
 Wilkinson - Bulldogs
 Shirley School
 Warrington School

Athletics
The Eastern Hancock High School Royals are a member of the Mid-Eastern Conference.  IHSAA sanctioned sports offered at EHHS include: tennis, cross country, football, volleyball, basketball, swimming, wrestling, baseball, softball, golf, and track and field. The school's only state championship in any sport came in the fall of 1985, when the football team defeated Jimtown High School in the Class A title game 20-7.

You can find a very detailed history of each Eastern Hancock Sports History by CLICKING HERE

Membership timeline

Conference Champions 

NOTE: School was in the East Central Conference from 1964-1968, but did not win any championships.

Sectional, Regional, Semi-State, State Champions

EH Athletic Hall of Famers 
Click Here for more info about inductees.

Arts

Music

Band 
Eastern Hancock has one band. It is a Marching Band that marches during halftime at football games and during several parades with their colorguard. They also perform several concerts at the school throughout the year. The band is currently directed by Mr. Daniel Buckalew. They participate annual in the Indiana State Fair Band Day as well as the Central Indiana District Solo and Ensemble.

In 2014, for the first time since 1986, they participated in the Indiana State Fair Band Day contest. They have participated annually since then. Their performances are as follows:

Choir 
Eastern Hancock has two choirs: One Show Choir and one Concert Choir, primarily known as the "High School Choir". Both choirs sing annually at nursing homes, as well as the school's scheduled concerts.

Show Choir 
At Eastern Hancock, the Show Choir, also known as the "Royal Singers" or the "Advanced Chorus," is the advanced choir. They sing many times throughout the year including, but not limited to, nursing homes once a year, the school's home volleyball and basketball games, the Indianapolis Zoo around Christmas, and the Riley Festival, a festival held annually in Greenfield, Indiana. An audition with a solo is required to be in the Show Choir.

High School Choir 
The High School Choir, also known as the "Intermediate Chorus," is the no-audition choir at Eastern Hancock. 8th Graders at Eastern Hancock Middle School, however, may audition to join the High School Choir one year early and earn High School credits that count toward their diploma. They sing at nursing homes and several other organized performances throughout the year.

Theatre 
Eastern Hancock has a Drama Club, where they put on two productions, one play and one musical, every year. The drama club has been around for many years. The following table states some of the many productions put on at Eastern Hancock.

Art 
Eastern Hancock has several art classes:
 Drawing I
 Photography
 Digital Design
 Advanced 2D/3D Art
 AP Art

Eastern Hancock also has an Art Club, hosted by the Art Teacher, that does various events throughout the year around the county.

Academics 
Eastern Hancock offers Science, Social Studies, Mathematics, English, and Fine Arts academic teams. They all compete annually at the Academic Super Bowl. They also won the 2003 and 2011 State Science Academic Championships. The Eastern Hancock Fine Arts Team finished 6th in the State in 2012.

In addition, Eastern Hancock has a Spell Bowl team. Spell Bowl members spend the semester figuring out how to spell complex words and compete every year at the annual Indiana Spell Bowl Competition.

School Information

Facilities 
There are many facilities around the school, including:
 Auditorium
 Main Office and Athletic Office
 Conference Room
 Computer Lab and Robotics Lab
 Cafeteria with Indoor and Outdoor Seating
 Library

Eastern Hancock also has many athletic facilities, including:
 2 American Football fields (One being a practice field)
 3 baseball/softball fields
 Track field
 Gymnasium with Concessions Stand
 8 tennis courts
 2 batting cages
 Weight Room
 Swimming Pool
 Varsity, Junior Varsity, and Standard Locker Rooms

Computing

Eastern Hancock uses a form of computer distribution known as 1:1 Computing. One to One computing is where all students and teachers are given a computer, or any other device that is similar. Laptops and desktops are the current standard, however, the students of Eastern Hancock High School and Eastern Hancock Middle School are given Chromebooks. The teachers in all three schools (High School, Middle School, and Elementary School) get laptops.

FFA
FFA is one of the largest extra-curricular activities at Eastern Hancock. The Eastern Hancock FFA has won and/or placed in the top 5 at many area, state, and national judging contests in both the senior and junior divisions.

See also
 List of high schools in Indiana
 Mid-Eastern Conference

References

 Eastern Hancock Superintendent Eastern Hancock Schools. Retrieved November 18, 2022.

External links
 Official website
 Eastern Hancock Schools
 Eastern Hancock Sports

Public high schools in Indiana
Schools in Hancock County, Indiana
1964 establishments in Indiana